Brunelli is an Italian surname. Notable people with the surname include:

Antonio Brunelli (1577-1630), Italian composer
Austin R. Brunelli (1907–1989), highly decorated combat veteran of World War II and the Korea War
Camilla Brunelli (born 1957), Italian historian
Carlotta Brunelli (born 1993), Italian weightlifter
Flaminio Giulio Brunelli (1936–2004), Italian physician and biologist
Giacomo Brunelli (born 1977), Italian artist working with photography
Giuseppe Brunelli (born 1922), Italian poet
Marcello Brunelli (1939–2020), Italian neurophysiologist and academic
Massimo Brunelli (born 1961), Italian former cyclist
Matteo Brunelli (born 1994), Italian footballer
Michela Brunelli (born 1974), Italian athlete
Nick Brunelli (born 1981), American swimmer
Sam Brunelli (born 1943), American football player
Santiago Brunelli (born 1998), Uruguayan footballer

See also
Luciano Brunelli, Italian textile company
 Brunello (surname)
 Brunello (disambiguation)

Italian-language surnames